Fred Howe (24 September 1912 – 1984) was an English professional footballer who played as a centre forward. In his career, he played for Stockport County, Hyde United, Liverpool, Manchester City, Grimsby Town, Watford, Oldham Athletic, and Ashton United.

In the 1936–37 season, Howe became the first Liverpool player to score a hat-trick in an away match against Manchester United. He remained the only player to do so until Mohamed Salah repeated the feat in October 2021.

References

External links
 Liverpool FC Profile

1912 births
English footballers
Association football forwards
Hyde United F.C. players
Stockport County F.C. players
Liverpool F.C. players
Manchester City F.C. players
Grimsby Town F.C. players
Oldham Athletic A.F.C. players
Watford F.C. wartime guest players
1984 deaths
People from Bredbury